The Being from Earth is a 1990 German science fiction drama film directed by David Vostell. It was filmed in Los Angeles in English. The Being from Earth tells the story of a day when the lives of various people are in danger due to the connection between their actions and the inexplicable events surrounding the birth of The Being from Earth. A hybrid of animal and plant, born from the sands of the Mojave Desert.

Plot
Melissa finishes her night shift in a genetics lab in the morning and drives to her boyfriend Teddy, who is planning a bank robbery with Goofy, a friend. Melissa tries to dissuade him. While driving on a highway through the Mojave Desert, Melissa panics and tells Teddy to stop the car immediately. They see the birth of the being out of the sands of the desert and take it home with them. A police officer is already on Teddy because of the planned bank robbery and follows them. After a fight, they leave the downed cop and drive back to Goofy's. They are pursued by curious neighbors. A group of three people, having found out about the birth through the visions of the medium Miriam, track down Melissa and Teddy. 
Goofy dies in a shootout. Melissa and the being are kidnapped by the group. Teddy tracks them to an abandoned factory floor and tries to free Melissa, but fails. Melissa gets tied up. With the sperm of the being, Melissa is supposed to be fertilized and give birth to a new being. Teddy can prevent this at the last second.

Production
The Being from Earth was created by Georg Sili, Bruce Fuller / KNB EFX Group and David Vostell. Filming took place in Los Angeles in Palmdale, California and in the Mojave Desert. Film laboratory was Consolidated Film Industries / CFI-Hollywood and Geyer-Werke Berlin. The film premiered on December 8, 1991, in the Kino Babylon in Berlin. The film was released on VHS in 1992 and in 2022 on Blu-ray in the Original English Version.

Reception
The film's title primarily refers to the being born from the earth. But it can also be understood as a metaphor. The being in the film is not a monster or beast. It's a kind of life that we don't know. The Being from Earth differs greatly from the conventional understanding of cinema and is an enigmatic film. The viewer's expectation of an explanatory, conventional narrative structure quickly gives way to the search for insight. Different interpretations of the plot are possible and also wanted. The film takes on a life of its own that is difficult to follow. The being in the film is extremely passive. It does not bite or kill. Characteristically, it can be compared to the creature in David Lynch's film Eraserhead.

Sources
David Vostell, Biografia / Recopilation 1978 - 2008 by Michaela Nolte, nivel88 Editor. .
The World of David Vostell 1976 - 2018, Sun Chariot Books, Cáceres , 2019. .
David Vostell, Worldcat

References

External links

1990 films
1990 science fiction films
1990s avant-garde and experimental films
German avant-garde and experimental films
English-language German films
Films shot in California
1990 drama films
1990s English-language films
1990 independent films
Films set in deserts
1990s German films